The Asher Brand Residence was built around 1870 in Dublin, Ohio, in the early Victorian style. The brick house is two stories and features a hipped tin roof, sanstone sills and lintels, triangular pediments over the front windows and a dentilled cornice. It was added to the National Register of Historic Places on April 11, 1979.

References 

Houses on the National Register of Historic Places in Ohio